Krachia tiara is a species of sea snail, a gastropod in the family Cerithiopsidae, which is known from European waters. It was described by Monterosato, in 1874.

Distribution
This marine species was at bathyal depths off Madeira, the Cape Verdes, the Canary Islands and in the Mediterranean Sea.

Description
The size of the shell attains 4 mm.

References

 Monterosato T. A. (di), 1874 (luglio): Recherches conchyliologiques, effectuées au Cap Santo Vito, en Sicile. (Traduz. dall'italiano di H. Crosse); Journal de Conchyliologie 22 (3) : 243-282 (luglio) 22 (4): 359-364 (ottobre)
 Bouchet P. & Warén A. (1993). Revision of the Northeast Atlantic bathyal and abyssal Mesogastropoda. Bollettino Malacologico supplemento 3: 579-840

Cerithiopsidae
Gastropods described in 1874
Molluscs of the Mediterranean Sea
Molluscs of the Canary Islands
Gastropods of Cape Verde